This is a list of protests related to the murder of George Floyd in Mississippi, United States.

Locations

Biloxi 
On May 30, about 50 people protested peacefully with signs and bullhorns along Beach Boulevard in front of the Biloxi Lighthouse. More than 60 demonstrated in the same place on May 31 as passing motorists honked horns in solidarity.

Gulfport 
On June 6, hundreds of protesters gathered in Jones Park and marched down Highway 90 in support of Black Lives Matter. The protest remained peaceful, despite rumors that bricks were present to rile up emotions.

Hattiesburg 
About 30 protesters, waving signs and chanting, marched peacefully on May 31 down Hardy Street, escorted by city police cars. An organizer of the event marched with her hands cuffed symbolically behind her back.

Jackson 
On Friday, May 29, about 25 demonstrators peacefully protested in front of the Mississippi State Capitol and marched through downtown Jackson. On June 6, between 3,000 and 5,000 protesters gathered for a Black Lives Matter rally in front of the state capitol. Jackson Mayor Chokwe Antar Lumumba attended the rally. Mississippi Highway Patrol distributed masks to protesters.

Meridian 
On June 2, a peaceful protest took place on North Hills Street, starting with four protesters and growing into the evening.

Oxford 
About 300 people peacefully demonstrated and marched around The Square for a couple of hours on May 30. That same afternoon, Ole Miss university police arrested a white public school teacher for vandalizing a Confederate statue on campus with spray paint.

Petal 
On May 28 at least 200 people protested outside Petal City Hall on Friday night, demanding that Mayor Hal Marx resign after he made a comment defending the police regarding George Floyd's murder and saying "I didn't see anything unreasonable." One elderly woman walked  with symbolic chains around her feet to get to the protest. Protests in Petal continued through the weekend and protesters showed up Tuesday June 2 at the city's Board of Aldermen meeting to demand Marx's resignation.

Starkville 
On June 6, thousands of protesters marched from Unity Park to the Amphitheater at Mississippi State University, lying down on their stomachs for eight minutes and forty-six seconds to honor George Floyd.

Tupelo 
Several hundred people protested peacefully at the Tupelo Fairpark on May 30.

Vicksburg 
On June 5, a large peaceful protest took place as demonstrators marched from the Vicksburg Police Department through the streets of downtown to protest the murder of George Floyd. The event was organized in part by the NAACP.

References 

Mississippi
2020 in Mississippi
Events in Mississippi
Riots and civil disorder in Mississippi
May 2020 events in the United States
June 2020 events in the United States